Port Isabel-Cameron County Airport  is a public airport in Cameron County, Texas, United States, serving the city of Port Isabel, Texas. Most U.S. airports use the same three-letter location identifier for the FAA and IATA, but Port Isabel-Cameron County Airport is assigned PIL by the FAA and has no IATA designation. IATA assigned PIL to Carlos Miguel Jiménez Airport in Pilar, Paraguay. 

The Port Isabel Detention Center, operated by U.S. Immigration and Customs Enforcement, is located adjacent to the airport.

The airport previously used the FAA LID of T31 until at least July 1992. This designation was subsequently reassigned to Aero Country Airport in McKinney, Texas.

History 
The airfield was built by the U.S. military in the 1940s and used by the United States Army Air Forces and United States Navy for gunnery training. The base was closed in the early 1960s and most base facilities were turned over to the U.S. Immigration and Customs Enforcement in 1961-1963 for renovation and reuse as a detention facility. The hangars and runways were turned over to the Cameron County Commissioners in 1963 to be used as a civil airport.

Facilities 
It has four runways:
 Runway 03/21: 5,000 x 150 ft. (1,524 x 46 m), surface: asphalt/concrete
 Runway 08/26: 5,317 x 150 ft. (1,621 x 46 m), surface: concrete
 Runway 13/31: 8,001 x 200 ft. (2,439 x 61 m), surface: asphalt/concrete
 Runway 17/35: 4,200 x 75 ft. (1,280 x 23 m), surface: asphalt/concrete

For the 12-month period ending 11 January 2017, the airport had 29,420 aircraft operations, an average of 81 per day: 54% military, 46% general aviation, and less than 1% air taxi. At that time there were 13 aircraft based at this airport: 46% single-engine, 46% multi-engine, and 8% gliders, with no jets nor helicopters.

References 
Notes

Citations

External links 
  at Texas DOT Airport Directory

Airports in Texas